Judy Balan (born 2 September 1981), is a comedy writer and author who debuted with the bestselling novel Two Fates: The Story of My Divorce, a parody of Chetan Bhagat's Two States: The Story of My Marriage.  She is also the author of the blog Woman and a Quarter.

Early life and education
Balan was born in Chennai, India.

Balan completed her schooling at the Good Shepherd Convent, Chennai and Sacred Heart, Church Park, in Chennai. She pursued a bachelor's degree in English Literature at Stella Maris, Chennai, India and worked at advertising agencies before becoming a full-time writer.

Career

Judy Balan is the author of Two Fates: The Story of My Divorce (published by Westland in Dec 2011) Sophie Says: Memoirs of a Breakup Coach (published by Westland in May 2013),  How to Stop Your Grownup From Making Bad Decisions (Book #1 in the Nina the Philosopher series published by HarperCollins, India and HarperCollins, USA in Feb 2016 and HarperCollins UK in June 2016), Tweenache in the Time of Hashtags (Book #2 in the Nina the Philosopher series) and Half Boyfriend - a parody of Chetan Bhagat's Half Girlfriend. She writes comedy across mediums and used to blog at Woman and a Quarter.

Family

Balan lives in Chennai.

References

External links
 "Two Fates: The Story Of My Divorce ". Malvika Sah, Verve Magazine, Volume 20, Issue 1, January, 2012

1981 births
Living people
Indian comedy writers
Women writers from Tamil Nadu
Writers from Chennai